Carol Hall (1936-2018) was an American composer and lyricist. Carol Hall could also refer to: 
 
Carol Hall (politician), member of the Connecticut House of Representatives
Carol K. Hall, American chemical engineer

See also
Carroll Hall, a residence hall at the University of Notre Dame, named for American founding father Charles Carroll